Frank Caraballo (born December 18, 1984) is an American mixed martial artist who competes in the featherweight division.

Mixed martial arts career

Bellator Fighting Championships
Caraballo lost to UFC veteran Waylon Lowe via unanimous decision at Bellator V.

At Bellator LI, Frank defeated Dustin Kempf via first-round TKO due to injury.

At Bellator LXVI, Frank defeated Donny Walker via flying knee KO in the fourth round and in doing so unified his NAAFS interim featherweight title with the real title to become the undisputed NAAFS featherweight champion.

Mixed martial arts record

|-
|Loss
|align=center| 14–9
|Alexandre Bezerra
|TKO (punches)
|XCC 24 - Xtreme Caged Combat 24 
|
|align=center|1
|align=center|3:57
|Bethlehem, Pennsylvania, United States 
|
|-
| Loss
|align=center| 14–8
|Keith Richardson
|Submission (rear-naked choke)
|RFO - Big Guns 16: The Summit
|
|align=center|1
|align=center|4:02
|Tallmadge, Ohio, United States
|
|-
| Win
|align=center| 14–7
|Cody Stevens
|Decision (unanimous)
|NAAFS: Rock N' Rumble 8
|
|align=center|3
|align=center|5:00
|Canton, Ohio, United States
|
|-
| Win
|align=center| 13–7
|Tommy Hayden
|TKO (retirement)
|NAAFS: Fight Night in the Flats 10
|
|align=center| 2
|align=center| 2:29
|Cleveland, Ohio, United States
|
|-
| Loss
|align=center| 12–7
|Ricky Musgrave
|Decision (unanimous)
|NAAFS: Driven MMA 1
|March 1, 2014
|align=center| 3
|align=center| 5:00
|Canton, Ohio, United States
|
|-
| Loss
|align=center| 12–6
|Chris Horodecki
|Decision (unanimous)
|PFC 1: Unrivaled
|October 25, 2013
|align=center| 3
|align=center| 5:00
|London, Ontario, Canada
|
|-
| Win
|align=center| 12–5
|Tony Hervey
|Submission (guillotine choke)
|NAAFS: Caged Vengeance 13
|March 30, 2013
|align=center|1
|align=center|2:42
|Canton, Ohio, United States
|
|-
| Loss
|align=center| 11–5
|Deividas Taurosevičius
|Submission (reverse triangle choke)
|Ring of Combat 43
|January 25, 2013
|align=center|1
|align=center|3:38
|Atlantic City, New Jersey, United States
|For the Ring of Combat Featherweight Championship.
|-
| Win
|align=center| 11–4
|Jeremy Czarnecki
|KO (spinning backfist and punches)
|NAAFS: Caged Vengeance 11
|August 4, 2012
|align=center|2
|align=center|0:38
|Cleveland, Ohio, United States
|
|-
| Win
|align=center| 10–4
|Antonio Castillo Jr.
|Submission (rear-naked choke)
|NAAFS: Fight Night in the Flats 8
|June 2, 2012
|align=center|1
|align=center|3:46
|Cleveland, Ohio, United States
|
|-
| Win
|align=center| 9–4
|Donny Walker
|KO (flying knee)
|Bellator 66
|April 20, 2012
|align=center|4
|align=center|2:25
|Cleveland, Ohio, United States
|
|-
| Win
|align=center| 8–4
|Dustin Kempf
|TKO (knee injury)
|Bellator 51
|September 24, 2011
|align=center|1
|align=center|1:19
|Canton, Ohio, United States
|
|-
| Win
|align=center| 7–4
|Doug Kulbis
|KO (punches)
|NAAFS: Rock N Rumble 5
|August 27, 2011
|align=center|1
|align=center|0:11
|Cleveland, Ohio, United States
|Featherweight Debut.
|-
| Win
|align=center| 6–4
|Brady Hovermale
|Decision (unanimous)
|NAAFS: Fight Night in the Flats 7
|June 4, 2011
|align=center|3
|align=center|5:00
|Cleveland, Ohio, United States
|Won the NAAFS Lightweight Championship.
|-
| Loss
|align=center| 5–4
|Kenny Giddens
|Technical Submission (arm-triangle choke)
|FCF: Freestyle Cage Fighting 44
|September 25, 2010
|align=center|2
|align=center|1:32
|Shawnee, Oklahoma, United States
|
|-
| Win
|align=center| 5–3
|Terry Blackwell
|Decision (unanimous)
|NAAFS: Rock N Rumble 4
|August 28, 2010
|align=center|3
|align=center|5:00
|Cleveland, Ohio, United States
|
|-
| Loss
|align=center| 4–3
|Daniel Mason-Straus
|Submission (punches)
|NAAFS: Caged Fury 9 
|February 20, 2010
|align=center|5
|align=center|3:57
|Cleveland, Ohio, United States
|Lost the NAAFS Interim Pro Series Lightweight Championship.
|-
| Win
|align=center| 4–2
|Nick Sorg
|Submission (armbar)
|NAAFS: Rock N Rumble 3
|August 28, 2009
|align=center| 2
|align=center| 1:59
|Cleveland, Ohio, United States
|Won NAAFS Interim Pro Series Lightweight Championship.
|-
| Loss
|align=center| 3–2
|Drew Dober
|TKO (punches)
|VFC 28: Throwdown
|July 24, 2009
|align=center| 2
|align=center| 3:58
|Iowa, United States
|
|-
| Loss
|align=center| 3–1
|Waylon Lowe
| Decision (unanimous)
|Bellator 5
|May 1, 2009
|align=center| 3
|align=center| 5:00
|Dayton, Ohio, United States
| Bellator Debut.
|-
| Win
|align=center| 3–0
|Phillip Tomblin
|Submission (guillotine choke)
|NAAFS: Caged Fury 6
|February 21, 2009
|align=center|1
|align=center|4:16
|Cleveland, Ohio, United States
|
|-
| Win
|align=center| 2–0
|Ben Pettit
|TKO (punches)
|NAAFS: Night of Champions 2008
|December 8, 2008
|align=center|1
|align=center|0:13
|Cleveland, Ohio, United States
|
|-
| Win
|align=center| 1–0
|Paul Compton
|Submission (guillotine choke)
|NAAFS: Rock N Rumble 2
|August 23, 2008
|align=center|1
|align=center|4:59
|Cleveland, Ohio, United States
|
|-

See also
List of Bellator MMA alumni
List of male mixed martial artists

References

External links

American male mixed martial artists
Living people
1984 births
Mixed martial artists from Ohio
Sportspeople from Cleveland